The Pratt & Whitney TF30 (company designation JTF10A) is a military low-bypass turbofan engine originally designed by Pratt & Whitney for the subsonic F6D Missileer fleet defense fighter, but this project was cancelled. It was later adapted with an afterburner for supersonic designs, and in this form it was the world's first production afterburning turbofan, going on to power the F-111 and the F-14A Tomcat, as well as being used in early versions of the A-7 Corsair II without an afterburner. First flight of the TF30 was in 1964 and production continued until 1986.

Design and development

In 1958, the Douglas Aircraft Company proposed a short-range, four-engined jet airliner to fill the gap below its new DC-8 intercontinental, known internally as the Model 2067. Intended to be marketed as  DC-9, it was not directly related to the later twin-engined Douglas DC-9. Pratt & Whitney (P&W) had offered its JT8A turbojet for the airliner, but Douglas preferred to go with a turbofan engine, which would have a greater fuel efficiency than a turbojet. P&W then proposed the JT10A, a half-scale version of its newly developed JT8D turbofan. Development of the new design began in April 1959, using the core of the JT8. Douglas shelved the model 2067 design in 1960, as the targeted US airlines preferred the newly offered Boeing 727.

In 1960, the United States Navy selected the JT10A, designated TF30-P-1, to power the proposed Douglas F6D Missileer, but the project was canceled in April 1961. Meanwhile, the TF30 had been chosen by General Dynamics for its entrant in the TFX competition for the United States Air Force and USN, which was selected for production as the F-111. The version of the TF30 for the F-111 included an afterburner.

Operational history

F-111

The F-111A, EF-111A and F-111E used the TF30-P-3 turbofan. The F-111 had problems with inlet compatibility, and many faulted the placement of the intakes behind the disturbed air of the wing.  Newer F-111 variants incorporated improved intake designs and most variants featured more powerful versions of the TF30 engine.  The F-111E was updated to use TF30-P-103 engines, the F-111D included the TF30-P-9/109, the FB-111A used the TF-30-P-7/107, and the F-111F had the TF30-P-100. The TF30 proved itself to be well-suited to the requirements of a high-speed low-altitude strike aircraft with a relatively long operational range, and F-111s in all guises would continue to use TF30s until their retirement.

A-7
In 1964, the subsonic LTV A-7A Corsair II won the US Navy's VAL competition for a light attack aircraft to replace the Douglas A-4 Skyhawk. The A-7A used a non-afterburning variant of the TF30, which would also power the improved A-7B and A-7C.  In 1965, the USAF selected the A-7D as a replacement for its fast-jet F-100 and F-105 supersonic fighter-bombers in the close air support role. Though the USAF had wanted the TF30, Pratt & Whitney was unable to meet the production timetable, because its facilities were already committed to producing other engines. Instead of producing the TF30 under license for P&W, the Allison Engine Company offered to the Air Force its TF41 turbofan, a license-built version of the RB.168-25R Spey.  The USAF selected the more powerful TF41 for the A-7D, as did the USN, for its similar A-7E.

F-14

The Grumman F-14 Tomcat with the TF30-P-414A was underpowered, because it was the Navy's intent to procure a jet fighter with a thrust-to-weight ratio (in clean configuration) of 1 or better (the US Air Force had the same goals for the F-15 Eagle and F-16 Fighting Falcon).  However, due to the intent to incorporate as many of the systems of the failed Navy version of the F-111, the F-111B, into the project, it was deemed that the initial production run of F-14s utilize the F-111B's powerplant.  The F-14A's thrust-to-weight ratio was similar to the F-4 Phantom II; however, the new fuselage and wing design provided greater lift and a better climb profile than the F-4. The TF30 was found to be ill-adapted to the demands of air combat and was prone to compressor stalls at high angle of attack (AOA), if the pilot moved the throttles aggressively. Because of the Tomcat's widely spaced engine nacelles, compressor stalls at high AOA were especially dangerous because they tended to produce asymmetric thrust that could send the Tomcat into an upright or inverted spin, from which recovery was very difficult.

The F-14's problems did not afflict TF30 engines in the USAF and RAAF F-111s to nearly the same extent. The F-111, while technically designated as a "fighter," was actually used as a ground attack aircraft and tactical bomber. A typical ground strike mission is characterized by less abrupt changes in throttle, angle of attack and altitude than an air-to-air combat mission. While it can still involve hard and violent maneuvers to avoid enemy missiles and aircraft, these maneuvers are generally still not nearly as hard and violent as those required in air-to-air combat, and the F-111 is a larger and less-maneuverable aircraft. Though the F-14A entered service with the Navy powered by the Pratt & Whitney TF30, by the end of the decade, following numerous problems with the original engine, the Department of Defense began procuring F110-GE-400 engines and installed them in the F-14A Plus (later redesignated to F-14B in 1991), which entered service with the fleet in 1988. These engines solved the reliability problems and provided nearly 30% more thrust, achieving a 1:1 dry thrust to weight ratio with a low fuel load.  The subsequent F-14D, a combination of both remanufactured/upgraded F-14As and new manufacture F-14Ds, also used F110-GE-400 engines.

Variants

Source:
XTF30-P-1 thrust.
YTF30-P-1
TF30-P-1 thrust,  with afterburner.
TF30-P-1ASimilar to -1 with a fuel filter-heater instead of a fuel filter, initially powered first two prototype F-111B.
TF30-P-2 thrust, intended to power the F6D Missileer.
TF30-P-3 thrust,  with afterburner.
TF30-P-5
TF30-P-6 thrust, powered the A-7A.
TF30-P-6A
TF30-P-6C
TF30-P-6E
TF30-P-7 thrust,  with afterburner.
TF30-P-8 thrust, initially powered the A-7B/C.
TF30-P-9 thrust,  with afterburner.
TF30-P-12 thrust,  with afterburner, powered the two pre-production F-111B.
TF30-P-12ASimilar to -12 with a fuel filter instead of a fuel filter-heater and deactivated wave-off feature, powered early production FB-111A.
TF30-P-14
TF30-P-16
TF30-P-18
YTF30-P-100
TF30-P-100Redesigned engine,  thrust,  with afterburner, powered the F-111F.
TF30-P-103Redesignated -3 upgraded with -100 components under the Pacer 30 program,  thrust,  with afterburner.
TF30-P-107Redesignated -7 upgraded with -100 components under the Pacer 30 program,  thrust,  with afterburner.
TF30-P-108Hybrid of -107 aft section and -109 fore section.
TF30-P-108RARedesignated -108 when in RAAF service, powered the F-111G.
TF30-P-109Redesignated -9 upgraded with -100 components under the Pacer 30 program,  thrust with afterburner.
TF30-P-109RARedesignated -109 when in RAAF service, powered the F-111C.
TF30-P-408Similar to -8,  thrust, powered the A-7B/C.
TF30-P-412Similar to -12
TF30-P-412ASimilar to -12A,  thrust,  with afterburner, powered early production F-14A.
TF30-P-414ASimilar to -412A, powered later production F-14A.
JTF10ACompany designation for the TF30 family of engines
JTF10A-1(XTF30-P-1) Intended to power the Douglas Model 2067.
JTF10A-6 Intended to power the Douglas Model 2086.
JTF10A-7(TF30-P-2)
JTF10A-8(TF30-P-6)
JTF10A-9(TF30-P-8)
JTF10A-10
JTF10A-15(TF30-P-18)
JTF10A-16(TF30-P-408)
JTF10A-20(TF30-P-1)
JTF10A-21(TF30-P-3)
JTF10A-27A(TF30-P-12)
JTF10A-27B(TF30-P-12A)
JTF10A-27D(TF30-P-7)
JTF10A-27F(TF30-P-412)
JTF10A-32C(TF30-P-100)
JTF10A-36(TF30-P-9)
Pratt & Whitney/SNECMA TF104Subsonic TF30 derivative modified by SNECMA, installed in Mirage IIIT and Mirage IIIV-01.
Pratt & Whitney/SNECMA TF106A derivative of the TF30 to power the Dassault Mirage IIIV VTOL fighter.
Pratt & Whitney/SNECMA TF306CA derivative of the TF30 tested in the Dassault Mirage F2.
Pratt & Whitney/SNECMA TF306E

 Gallery 

ApplicationsSource:
TF30
 Douglas F6D Missileer (planned)
 General Dynamics F-111
 General Dynamics F-111C
 General Dynamics–Grumman EF-111A Raven
 General Dynamics–Grumman F-111B
 General Dynamics F-111K
 Grumman F-14A Tomcat
 LTV A-7A/B/C Corsair II

TF104/TF106
 Dassault Mirage IIIV

TF306
 Dassault Mirage F2
 Dassault Mirage G2

Specifications (TF30-P-100)

See also

References

External links

 Pratt & Whitney TF30 historical page
 "Navy Faults Engine in Female Pilot's Crash", NY Times March 1, 1995

Low-bypass turbofan engines
TF30
1960s turbofan engines